Christy O'Connor Jnr (born Christopher O'Connor; 19 August 1948 – 6 January 2016) was an Irish professional golfer. He is best known for defeating American Fred Couples at the 1989 Ryder Cup, helping Europe secure the trophy.

Early life
O'Connor was born in Knocknacarra, Ireland in 1948. Knocknacarra is a village in Salthill that is within County Galway. He was the son of Elizabeth (née Noone) and John O'Connor. The family farmed cattle and pigs near a golf club.

O'Connor was not born with the "Junior" suffix. Rather, it was added to his name after he turned pro in the 1970s to distinguish him from his uncle Christy O'Connor, also a well-known professional golfer. (A "Senior" suffix was added to the elder Christy O'Connor's name too.)

Career
O'Connor turned professional in 1967. He played on the European circuit until the European Tour was founded in 1972. It took him a few years to find his footing but in 1975 he won two tournaments and finished 7th on the Order of Merit. His second victory of the year at the Carroll's Irish Open was particularly memorable. O'Connor became only the second Irishman to win his national open, the first since the 1940s. His good play earned him his first Ryder Cup appearance that year. The following year O'Connor would contend at the Open Championship for the first time. He opened with the co-lead with Seve Ballesteros, shooting a first round 69 (−3), before falling out of contention with a 73 and 75. He closed, however, with a respectable one-under round to finish in the top 5. O'Connor would finish in the top 30 of the Order of Merit for the third straight year. This good play helped O'Connor earn an invitation to play in the Masters for the only time as well.

Despite all of this success in his late 20s, O'Connor did not immediately progress into one of the stars of the European golfing scene. While young pros like Ballesteros, Nick Faldo, and Bernhard Langer were taking the European Tour by storm O'Connor was in the background during these years. In a five-season span, between 1977 and 1981, he recorded only four tops-10s and never finished better than 49th on the Order of Merit.

The 1982 season was a return to form. Though he only recorded two top-10s, he finished 40th on the Order of Merit and had his lowest scoring average ever. The next two seasons were similarly solid, with a number of top-10s, similar Order of Merit ranking, and improved scoring average every year.

Until his Ryder Cup heroics, O'Connor may be best known to international audiences for his performance at the 1985 Open Championship. He opened with an 64 (−6), taking an astonishing four stroke lead after the first round. He came back to the field with a second round 76 but was still in mix until the last day. He played with champion Sandy Lyle in the fourth round and finished only two shots back, placing T-3. He would record an additional five top-10s that year and finish 12th on the Order of Merit, easily his best in a decade.

He would build on this success, finishing in the top 30 of the Order of Merit every year, until winning the 1989 Jersey Open. He defeated Englishman Denis Durnian in a playoff. It was his first victory in 14 years, the longest gap between European Tour victories at the time. This victory helped him earn membership for the 1989 Ryder Cup team.

Despite his recent good play he was criticized by many in the media for being selected. He was not one of the nine automatic picks for the team; he was a captain's pick. He had the worst world ranking (#71) of anyone on either team. Early in the event, O'Connor confirmed these suspicions by losing his only team match on the second day of the event. He wound up facing Fred Couples in Sunday singles play. This match would define O'Connor's career. Couples was a rising star for the American team who, only a few years later, would be ranked #1 in the world. Some members of the British press referred to O'Connor as Europe's "weak link" entering the match. O'Connor, however, played evenly against Couples as the match went down to the last hole. On the 18th, the long-hitting Couples hit a perfect drive, cutting the dogleg and requiring only a 9-iron into the green. O'Connor hit a solid drive down the middle of the fairway but, unable to cut the dogleg, required much more distance to reach the green. He then hit a perfect 2-iron over a pond that skipped to within 4 feet. Couples blew his 9-iron shot over the green and failed to get up and down. He conceded the match to O'Connor. His good play was indispensable as Europe retained the cup with a 14–14 tie.

As the 1990s approached, O'Connor was hitting his early 40s, around the time that many pro golfer's games decline. O'Connor played relatively well for a few years however. He would finish in the top 75 of the Order of Merit between 1990 and 1992, culminating with his victory at the 1992 British Masters. He hit several remarkable recovery shots from behind trees during the last round which he took advantage of, making equally remarkable birdies. The victory qualified him for the NEC World Series of Golf, a prestigious winners-only event in America.

O'Connor would no longer remain competitive on the regular tour shortly after his win. He would not finish in the top 100 of the Order of Merit again after the 1992 season. He would, however, play very well for his first two seasons as a senior. Despite rarely playing in the United States during the heart of his career he decided to join the Senior PGA TOUR in 1999. He played full-time in 1999 and 2000, winning two events and earning over a million dollars. He would also play sporadically on the European Seniors Tour, winning the Senior British Open twice in back-to-back years.

Personal life
O'Connor was married to Ann. He had three children, Nigel, Ann, and Darren. His son Darren died in a car accident when he was 17 years old.

O'Connor was a supporter of the Special Olympics. O'Connor was also active in golf course design, being involved in the design of at least 18 courses in Ireland, and many more abroad.

O'Connor died whilst on holiday with his wife Ann on 6 January 2016 in Tenerife, Canary Islands.

Professional wins (16)

European Tour wins (4)

European Tour playoff record (2–2)

Safari Circuit wins (2)

Other wins (6)
1973 Carroll's Irish Match Play Championship
1974 Irish Dunlop Tournament
1975 Carroll's Irish Match Play Championship
1976 Sumrie-Bournemouth Better-Ball (with Eamonn Darcy)
1977 Carroll's Irish Match Play Championship
1978 Sumrie-Bournemouth Better-Ball (with Eamonn Darcy)

Senior PGA Tour wins (4)

European Senior Tour wins (2)

Source:

Results in major championships

CUT = missed the half-way cut (3rd round cut in 1984 Open Championship)
"T" indicates a tie for a place
Note: O'Connor never played in the U.S. Open or the PGA Championship.

Senior major championships

Wins (2)

Team appearances
Double Diamond International (representing Ireland): 1972, 1974, 1975, 1976, 1977
Sotogrande Match/Hennessy Cognac Cup (representing Great Britain and Ireland): 1974 (winners), (representing Ireland) 1984
World Cup (representing Ireland): 1974, 1975, 1978, 1985, 1989, 1992
Ryder Cup (representing Great Britain and Ireland/Europe): 1975, 1989 (tied – retained Cup)
Philip Morris International (representing Ireland): 1975, 1976
Dunhill Cup (representing Ireland): 1985, 1989, 1992
Praia d'El Rey European Cup: 1998 (tie)
Source:

References

External links

Irish male golfers
European Tour golfers
European Senior Tour golfers
PGA Tour Champions golfers
Winners of senior major golf championships
Ryder Cup competitors for Europe
Golf course architects
RTÉ Sports Person of the Year winners
Sportspeople from Galway (city)
Irish expatriates in Spain
1948 births
2016 deaths